The 2021–22 Youngstown State Penguins men's basketball team represents Youngstown State University in the 2021–22 NCAA Division I men's basketball season. The Penguins, led by fifth-year head coach Jerrod Calhoun, played their home games at the Beeghly Center in Youngstown, Ohio as members of the Horizon League. they finished the regular season 18–14, 12–9 in Horizon League play to finish in seventh place. They lost to Robert Morris in the first round of the Horizon League tournament. The Penguins accepted an invitation to play in The Basketball Classic tournament, formerly known as the CollegeInsider.com Tournament.

Previous season
In a season limited due to the ongoing COVID-19 pandemic, the Penguins finished the 2020–21 season 15–12, 9–11 in Horizon League play to finish in sixth place. They defeated UIC in the first round of the Horizon League tournament before losing in the quarterfinals to Oakland.

Offseason

Departures

Incoming transfers

Recruiting class

Roster

Schedule and results

|-
!colspan=12 style=|Regular season

|-
!colspan=12 style=| Horizon League tournament
|-

|-
!colspan=12 style=| The Basketball Classic
|-

Source

References

Youngstown State Penguins men's basketball seasons
Youngstown State Penguins
Youngstown State Penguins men's basketball
Youngstown State Penguins men's basketball
Youngstown State Penguins